Ibercaja Banco, S.A., stylised as iberCaja, is a Spanish financial services company based in Zaragoza. It was created by the Caja de Ahorros and Monte de Piedad of Zaragoza, Aragón and Rioja (Ibercaja) in 2011, to develop its financial activity, being initially the shareholder of 100% of the bank. After the acquisition of Caja3 by Ibercaja Banco, in the process of banking restructuring in Spain, 87.8% was owned by Ibercaja and 12.2% by the three Caja3 shareholders (Caja de Badajoz, Caja Inmaculada and Caja Círculo).

Together with the General Deputation of Aragon, owns the company Montañas de Aragón which controls the ski resort Aramón.

See also
 List of banks in Spain

References

External links 

 Ibercaja

Banks of Spain
Banks established in 2011
Banks under direct supervision of the European Central Bank
Companies based in Aragon
Zaragoza